The 2010 World Judo Juniors Championships was an edition of the World Judo Juniors Championships, organised by the International Judo Federation. It was held in Agadir, Morocco from 21 to 24 October 2010.

Medal summary

Men's events

Women's events

Source Results

Medal table

References

External links
 

World Judo Junior Championships
 U21
World Championships, U21
World Championships, U21
Judo competitions in Morocco
Judo
Judo, World Championships U21